José María Figaredo (born June 26, 1988) is a Spanish politician and a member of the Congress of Deputies for Vox representing the Asturias constituency.

References 

1988 births
Living people
Members of the 13th Congress of Deputies (Spain)
Members of the 14th Congress of Deputies (Spain)
Vox (political party) politicians